The Liturgy of St. John Chrysostom is an  choral composition by Pyotr Ilyich Tchaikovsky, his Op. 41, composed in 1878. It consists of settings of texts taken from the Divine Liturgy of St. John Chrysostom, the most celebrated of the eucharistic services of the Eastern Orthodox Church. Tchaikovsky's setting constitutes the first "unified musical cycle" of the liturgy.

Background

Tchaikovsky, known primarily for his symphonies, concertos and ballets, was deeply interested in the music and liturgy of the Russian Orthodox Church. In 1875, he compiled A Concise Textbook of Harmony Intended to Facilitate the Reading of Sacred Musical Works in Russia.

In an 1877 letter to his friend and patroness Nadezhda von Meck, he wrote:

For me [the church] still possesses much poetical charm. I very often attend the services. I consider the liturgy of St. John Chrysostom one of the greatest productions of art. If we follow the service very carefully, and enter into the meaning of every ceremony, it is impossible not to be profoundly moved by the liturgy of our own Orthodox Church... to be startled from one's trance by a burst from the choir; to be carried away by the poetry of this music; to be thrilled when... the words ring out, 'Praise the name of the Lord!' – all this is infinitely precious to me! One of my deepest joys!

An April 1878 letter to von Meck signified his interest in producing a composition based on the liturgy.

A vast and untrodden field of activity lies open to composers here. I appreciate certain merits in Bortniansky, Berezovsky and others; but how little their music is in keeping with... the whole spirit of Orthodox liturgy! ... It is not improbable that I shall decide to set the entire liturgy of St. John Chrysostom. I shall arrange all this by July.

The composition took place between 4/16 May and 27 May/8 June 1878 (see Old Style and New Style dates). The manuscript was sent to his publisher Pyotr Jurgenson in July; this is confirmed by a letter to von Meck in the same month, where Tchaikovsky wrote that he was "happy in the consciousness of having finished a work... Now I can indulge in full my secret delight in doing nothing." It appeared in print early in 1879.

Censorship and legal issues

At the time, the prospect of setting any church music was fraught with issues. The Imperial Chapel held the monopoly on the composition and performance of sacred music; according to an 1816  by Alexander I, all approval had to be granted by the director of the chapel. Tchaikovsky wrote "they guard this monopoly very jealously, and will not permit new settings of the liturgy under any circumstances whatsoever".

Jurgenson's publication of Tchaikovsky's setting was promptly banned by the director of the chapel, Nikolai Bakhmetiev, on the grounds that it had been published without his approval. Tchaikovsky had only submitted his setting to the Moscow Office of Sacred Censorship. Legal proceedings were initiated against Jurgenson, and 143 of his plates of the Liturgy were confiscated. The Chief Administration for Printed Matter authorised publication, but Bakhmetiev continued his campaign against Jurgenson, who counter-sued Bakhmetiev. Jurgenson won his case in June 1879, and the Interior Minister passed judgement in December 1879 in favour of Jurgenson. The confiscated plates were released in November and December 1880 by the Synod, who ruled that the church censor could approve the publication of sacred music without the chapel's input. This decision had ground-breaking implications – for the first time in many years, it became possible for Russian composers to create sacred music, without being subjected to bureaucratic review.

Performances

The first performance took place in the Imperial University of Kiev Church in June 1879. The Moscow Musical Society gave a private concert at the Moscow Conservatory in November 1880; in a letter to Nadezhda von Meck, Tchaikovsky wrote that it was "altogether one of the happiest moments of my musical career".

A public performance given by the Russian Musical Society took place in Moscow in December 1880. The controversy surrounding the work led to an "unusually crowded" audience, which received the work positively and recalled Tchaikovsky numerous times at the end of the concert.

Critical opinion was divided. In his review of the work, César Cui acknowledged the importance of the work and its "almost political significance", but was less complimentary about the work itself:

...choral sonority is exploited with skill and effectiveness; unfortunately, the higher register predominates... [this] gives an impression of festive brilliance and magnificence at first, but then lose their fascination as a result of too frequent repetition... [Tchaikovsky] has brought to his Liturgy an experienced, practised hand and a sense of decorum, rather than powerful inspiration... wholly satisfactory and estimable though it be in itself, [it] holds only secondary place among his other works.

Ambrose, the vicar of Moscow, was particularly opposed to the work; he published a letter in the Rouss, in which he asserted that the public performance of the liturgy was a profanation. "We cannot begin to say how the combination of the words 'Liturgy' and 'Tchaikovsky' offend the ear of the Orthodox Christian", he wrote, and asked what would happen if a Jewish composer should create a setting of the liturgy: "our most sacred words would be mocked at and hissed". Ambrose also refused the performance of Tchaikovsky's Liturgy at his friend Nikolai Rubinstein's funeral. Tchaikovsky's brother Modest wrote that his brother was "deeply hurt" by the vicar's opinion of the work.

Legacy

Tchaikovsky's setting of the Divine Liturgy, along with his All-Night Vigil and his nine sacred songs, were of seminal importance in the later interest in Orthodox music. Other composers, encouraged by the freedom created by the new lack of restriction on sacred music, soon followed Tchaikovsky's example. The structure that Tchaikovsky used, as well as his use of free settings for the components of the liturgy, were emulated by a whole generation of Russian composers in their own settings of the liturgy, including Arkhangelsky, Chesnokov, Gretchaninov, Ippolitov-Ivanov, and Rachmaninoff.

Music and structure

While most of the work uses traditional Slavonic chants with simple homophonic settings, Tchaikovsky composed new music and free settings for six of the movements. These include movements 6, 8, 10, 11, 13 and 14. Movements 10 and 11 have some polyphony and imitation, providing a contrast from the block-chordal arrangement of the majority of the work.

The work consists of 15 major divisions. Performances require approximately 48 minutes.

See also
Liturgy of St. John Chrysostom (Rachmaninoff)
Liturgy of St. John Chrysostom (Leontovych)
Divine Liturgy of St. John Chrysostom (Mokranjac)

Notes

References

External links

Tchaikovsky Research 

Compositions by Pyotr Ilyich Tchaikovsky
Choral compositions
1878 compositions
Eastern Orthodox liturgical music
John Chrysostom